The 2020 season was the Las Vegas Raiders' 51st in the National Football League, their 61st overall, and their first in the Las Vegas metropolitan area, as well as their first to not take place in California. The Raiders began playing their home games in the brand-new Allegiant Stadium. The season was the third under head coach Jon Gruden since his rehiring by the organization (seventh overall) and final full season as a head coach.

With a Week 17 victory over the Denver Broncos the Raiders improved on their 7–9 record from the previous season finishing 8–8. With two wins, the Raiders became the third team originating in the American Football League to reach 500 all-time wins. However despite a 6–3 start with wins against the Chiefs, Saints, and Browns, all of whom would go on to make the playoffs, the Raiders suffered a late-season collapse for the second consecutive year, losing five of their last seven games and after a devastating loss to the Dolphins in week 16, they were eliminated from playoff contention for the fourth consecutive year.

As a result of the ongoing COVID-19 pandemic, all games at Allegiant Stadium took place without fans.

Relocation 
On January 22, 2020, the Raiders officially announced their relocation to Las Vegas. This marked the third re-location of the franchise and made the 2020 season the team's first ever season as the only professional football team in its metropolitan area. The team shared the Bay Area market with the San Francisco 49ers during both of its tenures in Oakland, and shared the Los Angeles market with the Los Angeles Rams during its 13-year stint in Southern California.

Roster transactions

Free agents signed

Players released

Draft

Notes
 The Chicago Bears traded first- and third-round selections as well as 2019 first- and sixth-round selections to the Raiders in exchange for defensive end/outside linebacker Khalil Mack, a second-round selection, and a seventh-round conditional selection (condition unknown), originally a fifth-round selection.
 The Raiders traded picks 91 and 159 to the New England Patriots in exchange for picks 100, 139 and 172.
 The Raiders traded picks 121 and 172 to the Detroit Lions in exchange for pick 109.

Undrafted free agents

Staff

Final roster

Preseason
The Raiders' preseason schedule was announced on May 7, but was later cancelled due to the COVID-19 pandemic.

Regular season

Schedule
The Raiders' 2020 schedule was announced on May 7.

Note: Intra-division opponents are in bold text.

Game summaries

Week 1: at Carolina Panthers
In game one as the Las Vegas Raiders, the Raiders traveled across the country to play the Carolina Panthers. The Raiders got the ball first, but could accomplish nothing and quickly fell behind by three as the Panthers converted their opening drive into a 47-yard field goal. In the Raiders second possession of the game, Derek Carr hit rookie wide receiver Henry Ruggs on a 45-yard pass play to set the Raiders up at Carolina's one-yard line. Josh Jacobs scored on the next play to give the Raiders the 7–3 lead. The Panthers quickly answered on a 10-play drive that ended in a touchdown and 10–7 lead for the Panthers. A 15-play, 73-yard Raider drive stalled on the Panther six-yard line as Daniel Carlson tied the game with a 20-yard field goal. Two more Panther field goals sandwiched around another Raider scoring drive, this one an eight-play, 75-yard drive capped off by a Carr pass to newly acquired wide receiver Nelson Agholor as the Raiders went to the half leading 17–15.

In the second half, the Raider defense limited the Panthers to two three-and-outs in their first two possessions as the Raiders pushed the lead to 20–15 on a 54-yard Carlson field goal. Jacobs rushed for his second touchdown of the game with just over five minutes remaining in the third and it looked like the Raiders had put the game away, leading 27–15. However, a 17-play, 75-yard drive for the Panthers ended in a Teddy Bridgewater touchdown pass to Christian McCaffrey. Following a Raiders punt, Bridgewater hit Robby Anderson on a 75-yard touchdown pass to give the Panthers a 30–27 lead with eight minutes remaining in the game. The Raiders answered with a 75-yard drive as Jacobs scored his third touchdown on the day, a six-yard run to give the Raiders a 34–30 lead with four minutes remaining. Needing a touchdown to win, the Panthers moved to midfield, but were stuffed on a fourth and one and the Raiders took over with a chance to run out the game. The Raiders failed to notch a first down to end the game and were forced to punt to the Panthers with eight seconds remaining. The Panthers ran out of time as the Raiders earned their first victory as the Las Vegas Raiders, winning 34–30.

Week 2: vs. New Orleans Saints

The Raiders opened Allegiant Stadium on Monday Night Football when the New Orleans Saints visited in Week 2. The Saints took the opening possession 62 yards in 11 plays to score the first points in Allegiant Stadium history as Wil Lutz kicked a field goal from 31 yards out to give the Saints an early 3–0 lead. The Raiders managed a first down on their first possession, but were forced to punt quickly thereafter. The Saints increased their lead by scoring the first touchdown in Allegiant Stadium history as Alvin Kamara scored from one-yard out to push the lead to 10–0. The teams exchanged punts on their next possessions before the Raiders went 63 yards on 11 plays as Derek Carr hit fullback Alec Ingold on a three-yard touchdown pass to draw the score to 10–7 with eight mintutes remaining in the second quarter. The Saints quickly returned the favor, scoring on a Drew Brees pass to Jared Cook to return the lead to 10. A 10-play, 75-yard drive capped off by Zay Jones touchdown catch brought the Raiders within three with less than two minutes remaining in the half. The Saints, looking to extend the lead before half, turned the ball over as Nicholas Morrow intercepted Brees at the Saints' 40. The Raiders moved the ball inside the New Orleans' 10-yard line, but could not go farther, settling for a Daniel Carlson 28-yard field goal to tie the game at 17 at the half.

In the second half, the Raiders took the opening drive 75 yards in nine plays capped off by a Carr pass to Darren Waller to give the Raiders their first lead of the game, 24–17. A defensive stop by the Raiders gave the ball back to the offense, looking to score on their fifth straight possession, but a Carr fumble on the Saints' 40 ended the drive. The Raider defense continued to hold the Saints in check, forcing yet another punt. The Raiders would capitalize, moving 89 yards on 10 plays before Jalen Richard scored on a 20-yard run to give the Raiders a 31–17 lead with just under eight minutes remaining the game. The Saints quickly answered going 67 yards before Kamara scored from three yards out to narrow the lead to seven. With just over four minutes remaining in regulation, the Raiders, helped by a pass interference penalty by Janoris Jenkins, moved into Saints' territory and Carlson hit a 54-yard field goal to put the game out of reach at 34–24. The Saints ran out of time as the Raiders won the inaugural game at Allegiant Stadium and moved their record to 2–0 on the young season.  The Raiders also reached 500 career wins encompassing regular season and playoffs, the third team originating in the American Football League to do so.

Week 3: at New England Patriots

The Raiders returned to the East Coast to face the New England Patriots at Gillette Stadium. Neither offense got off to an early start as the Patriots sandwiched two punts around a Raider punt. On the next Raider drive, the Raiders moved 77 yards before Josh Jacobs fumbled the ball at the New England 13-yard line. The Patriots took over, but quickly turned the ball back over to the Raiders as Johnathan Abram intercepted Cam Newton at the Patriots' 38, returning it to the 14-yard line. The Raiders could manage nothing on the ensuing possession and settled for a 29-yard Daniel Carlson field goal and 3–0 lead. The Patriots tied it on their next drive on a 33-yard Nick Folk field goal. Two plays into the ensuing Raider possession, Carr was stripped of the ball and the Patriots took over at the Raiders' 42-yard line. The Raider defense held the Patriots to a 23-yard field goal as the Patriots took a 6–3 lead. The Raiders were forced to punt again on their next possession and the Patriots took over with about five minutes remaining in the half. An 88-yard drive capped by a Rex Burkhead 11-yard touchdown catch from Newton extended the Patriots lead to 13–3. The Raiders' offense finally got going, moving 75 yards in four plays before Foster Moreau caught a one-yard pass for a touchdown as Vegas narrowed the lead to 13–10. The Patriots ran out the clock and entered half time with the lead.

In the second half, the Raiders moved into Patriot territory, but Carlson missed a 41-yard field goal. New England extended its lead on their next possession, going 69 yards while Burkhead scored from five yards out to push the lead to 20–10. A Raider punt preceded a 32-yard field goal by Folk as the Raiders fell behind 23–10. Vegas moved 68 yards on their next possession, but the drive stalled inside the Patriot 10-yard line. The Raiders settled for another Carlson field goal to draw within 10. However, another Burkhead touchdown run pushed the Patriot lead to 17 with just over five minutes remaining in the game. On the ensuing possession, Carr was sacked and fumbled in the end zone and Deatrich Wise Jr. recovered the fumble to put the game out of reach at 36–13. With just over three minutes remaining, the Raiders were able to drive into Patriot territory and score on a 13-yard touchdown pass to Hunter Renfrow to make the final score 36–20.

Week 4: vs. Buffalo Bills

Returning home to faced the undefeated Buffalo Bills, the Raiders quickly fell behind as the Bills moved 75 yards on the first possession and took the lead on a Gabe Davis 26-yard touchdown pass from Josh Allen. the Raiders responded with a Daniel Carlson 54-yard field goal to narrow the lead to 7–3. However, Buffalo again moved the down the field on a 75-yard drive capped off by a 11-yard touchdown pass from Allen to Cole Beasley to extend the Bills lead to 14–3. Las Vegas again could only answer with a field goal by Carlson from 39 yards out. The Raider defense was able to prevent the Bills from scoring another touchdown on their next possession, but the Bills did get a 34-yard field goal from Tyler Bass to move the lead to 17–6. The Raider offense, taking over with just over four minutes remaining in the half, moved to the Bills' three-yard line with 13 seconds remaining before Derek Carr hit Jason Witten for his first touchdown as a Raider. The score narrowed the Bills lead to 17–13 at the half.

The Raiders settled for another Carlson field goal to start off the second half, this one from 25 yards out to bring the Raiders within one at 17–16. Both teams then exchanged punts on their next possessions before the Bills took over at the Raider 45 following a 38-yard punt return by Andre Roberts. Allen capped off the short drive with a one-yard run on the first play of the fourth quarter to give the Bills a 23–16 lead after a missed extra point. After moving to the Buffalo 36-yard line, Darren Waller fumbled after making a catch and Bills recovered. Four plays later, Devin Singletary from two yards out to push the lead to 30–16. On the ensuing possession, the Raider went for it from their own 34 on a fourth and one, but were stopped, turning the ball over on downs. The Bills wen backward on their possession and were forced to punt the ball to the Raiders. Taking over with 7:20 remaining in the game, the Raiders moved to the Buffalo 33 before Carr was sacked and fumbled the ball and Bills lineman Quinton Jefferson recovered. The Bills were again forced to punt and the Raiders got the ball with 3:30 remaining in the game. Carr hit Nelson Agholor on a seven-yard touchdown pass with 1:20 remaining to bring the Raiders with 30–23. After a failed onside kick, the Bills were able to run out the clock as the defeated the Raiders 30–23. The loss was the second in a row for the Raiders, dropping them to 2–2 on the season.

Week 5: at Kansas City Chiefs

Traveling to Kansas City to face the undefeated Chiefs, the Raider defense started well, forcing the Chiefs to punt. Led by Josh Jacobs, the Raiders drove to the Chief 20-yard line before settling for a 38-yard field by Daniel Carlson to take an early 3–0 lead. The Chiefs quickly responded, going 88 yards in just over four minutes as Patrick Mahomes scored from three yards out to give KC the 7–3 lead. On the ensuing possession, Derek Carr threw his first interception of the season, setting the Chiefs up at the Raider 28-yard line. Tyreek Hill scored on a 10-yard run to push the lead to 14–3 as the Raiders appeared to be on the verge of being routed. However, the Raiders answered on a five-play scoring drive as Carr his Nelson Agholor on a 59-yard touchdown pass to draw the Raiders within four. The Chiefs again extended the lead, scoring on an eight-yard pass from Mahomes to Sammy Watkins, moving the Chiefs back ahead by 11, 21–10. With just over nine minutes remaining in the second quarter, the Raider offense refused to give up, moving 75 yards on five plays before Carr hit Darren Waller on a five-yard touchdown pass which again narrowed the Chief lead to four. The Raider defense forced the Chiefs to punt on the next possession for the second time in the game, giving the Raiders the ball at their own 20 with 4:16 remaining in the half. Carr then hit Henry Ruggs on a 72-yard touchdown pass to give the Raiders the lead at 24–21. The Chiefs tied it with a Harrison Butker 32-yard field goal with 28 seconds left in the half which left the game tied at 24 at the half.

After the offensive outburst in the first half, each team punted on their first two possessions in the third quarter and no points were scored in the quarter. The Raiders took over with 7:14 left in the quarter and engineered a 13-play, eight-minute drive that ended with Jacobs scoring from seven yards out with 14:14 remaining in the game. The score gave the Raiders the 30–24 lead as Carlson's extra point was no good. The Chiefs again were forced to punt and the Raiders extended the lead to 33–24 on a Carlson 43-yard field goal with 6:34 remaining. The Chiefs, trailing with time ticking down went for it on fourth down at their own 28. However, Mahomes' pass was intercepted by Raider safety Jeff Heath and he returned the ball to the Chief two-yard line. Jacobs punched the ball in on the next play and the Raiders moved the lead to 16 with 5:36 remaining. The Chief offense finally got going, moving 75 yards on eight plays before Mahomes hit Travis Kelce on a seven-yard touchdown pass. The two-point conversion was successful and the Chiefs moved within eight at 40–32. With 3:57 remaining, the Raiders notched one first down and moved to the KC 45-yard line at the two-minute warning. Faced with a fourth-and-one, John Gruden elected to go for it and Carr took the quarterback sneak up the middle for the first down and assured the win. The Raiders were then able to kneel out the clock and hold on to the 40–32 win. The win moved the Raiders to 3–2 on the season as their bye week lay ahead.

Week 7: vs. Tampa Bay Buccaneers

The Raiders were scheduled to play the Tampa Bay Buccaneers on Sunday Night Football at Allegiant Stadium. However, after Raiders offensive tackle Trent Brown tested positive for COVID-19, the game was moved to earlier in the day and to ensure, if the game had to be rescheduled, that a game would be played on Sunday Night Football. Shortly thereafter, the Raiders placed five more players on the COVID-19 list including the entire starting offensive line and safety Johnathan Abram. On October 24, left tackle Kolton Miller, center Rodney Hudson, and guards Gabe Jackson and Denzelle Good were available and played in the game.

John Gruden faced his former team whom he led to a Super Bowl XXXVII win over the Raiders in 2003. The Raiders jumped to an early lead after the Bucs were forced to punt on their first possession. A six-play, 70-yard drive was capped off by a Nelson Agholor touchdown reception from Derek Carr. Tampa Bay answered on the ensuing possession as Tom Brady scored from one yard out to even the score at seven. A Raider field goal gave the Raiders a 10–7 lead early in the second quarter. After each team traded punts, the Buccaneers took the lead on five-yard touchdown pass from Brady to Rob Gronkowski moving the score to 14–7. A Raider punt preceded another Tampa touchdown, this one a 33-yard pass from Brady to Scotty Miller as Tamp took a 21–10 lead at the half.

In the second half, Vegas was forced to punt again while Tampa extended the lead to 24–10 on a Ryan Succop 47-yard field goal. Trailing by 14, the Raiders cut the lead in half on their next possession as Darren Waller scored on a one-yard pass from Carr. Vegas moved even closer on their next possession as Daniel Carlson hit a 36-yard field goal to narrow the lead to 24–20. However, Brady's third touchdown pass on the day preceded a Carr interception setting up Tampa inside the Raider 25-yard line. Ronald Jones II rushed for a touchdown as the lead ballooned to 38–20. After Vegas turned the ball over on downs, the Bucs scored again, on Brady's fourth touchdown pass to finish the game 45–20.

The loss moved the Raiders to 3–3 on the season.

Week 8: at Cleveland Browns

Prior to the game, offensive lineman Trent Brown was rushed to the hospital after a botched IV attempt let air enter his bloodstream. Brown was released from the hospital two days later. A few days later, Brown was placed back on the COVID-19/reserve list and was expected to miss several weeks.

The Raiders traveled to play the Browns in Cleveland in poor weather conditions including high winds. As a result, both offenses struggled in the game as the Raiders missed an early field goal attempt on their first possession. A Browns' fumble on the ensuing possession led to nothing as the Raiders were forced to punt. The Brown managed a 14-play, 60-yard drive on their next possession before Cody Parkey hit a 41-yard field goal early in the second quarter. The Raiders answered on the ensuing possession, moving 58 yards on 16 plays before Daniel Carlson connected on a 29-yard field goal to tie the game at three. Following a three-and-out for the Browns, the Raiders took the lead on a Carlson 33-yard field goal as the half expired.

The Brown quickly tied the game at six on the first possession of the second half. However, the Raiders responded with a 15-play, 75-yard drive capped off a Hunter Renfrow four-yard touchdown catch from Derek Carr to give Vegas the 13– lead. A missed field goal by the Browns set the Raiders up for another long drive, this one 13 play and covering 74 yards while using up almost nine minutes of game time. Josh Jacobs was stuffed at the goal line on three straight running plays as the Raiders settled for the field goal and the 16–6 lead with 4:24 remaining in the game. The Browns were able to move the ball 56 yards on their next possession, but a missed field goal turned the ball over to the Raiders who were able to run out the clock for the 16–6 win.

The win moved the Raiders to 4–3 on the season.

Week 9: at Los Angeles Chargers

Vegas traveled to their former home Los Angeles to play the Chargers at SoFi Stadium. After trading punts on their first possessions, the Chargers missed a field goal setting the Raiders up at their 38-yard line. Seven plays later, Devontae Booker scored for the Raiders on a 23-yard run to give Vegas a 7–0 lead. The Chargers answered on a 13-play drive capped off by a give yard run by Kalen Ballage to tie the game at seven. The teams again exchanged punts before the Raiders took the lead on a 14-yard touchdown run by Josh Jacobs. The Charges answered again, tying the game at 14 on a Keenan Allen 27-yard pass from Justin Herbert. Derek Carr was sacked and fumbled the ball on the Raiders next possession with less than 10 seconds remaining which set the Chargers up for a 45-yard field goal and a 17–14 lead at the half.

Vegas scored touchdown on their first two possessions of the second half as Nelson Agholor caught a 45-yard pass from Carr and Darren Waller scored on a two-yard pass from Waller to give the Raiders a 28–17 lead. A field goal by the Chargers narrowed the lead to eight. Following a Vegas punt, Herbert hit Gabe Nabers on a four-yard touchdown pass. The two-point conversion failed, leaving the Raiders with a 28–26 lead with nine minutes remaining in the game. The Raiders were again forced to punt, but Charger return man K. J. Hill fumbled the punt, giving the Raiders the ball at the Chargers 31. The Raiders drive stalled at the Chargers 13 and the Raiders settled for a 31-yard field goal and a 31–26 lead. With 4:37 remaining in the game, the Chargers moved into Raider territory attempting to win the game in the final seconds. Getting to the one-yard line with one second left, Herbert hit Donald Parham in the corner of the end zone as time expired for an apparent game-winning touchdown. However, upon review, the ball clearly hit the ground as Parham fell and the call was overturned resulting in an incomplete pass and a Raider victory.

The win marked the Raiders second straight as they moved to 5–3 on the season.

Week 10: vs. Denver Broncos

The Raiders played a complete game and dominated on both sides of the ball. The defense, which had not intercepted a pass in its last three games, intercepted Broncos QB Drew Lock four times. The Raiders scored four rushing touchdowns in the game, their most of the season.

Week 11: vs. Kansas City Chiefs

With the loss, the Raiders failed to sweep the Chiefs, and continued an ongoing drought of a Chiefs sweep that has been in effect since 2012.

On November 17, the Raiders placed two players on the COVID-19/reserve list. Defensive end Clelin Ferrell and cornerback Lamarcus Joyner joined linebacker Cory Littleton what was placed on the list November 12. On November 18, the Raiders placed seven additional defensive players on the list: safety Johnathan Abram, defensive tackles Maliek Collins, Johnathan Hankins, and Kendal Vickers, defensive end Arden Key, cornerback Isaiah Johnson, and practice-squad defensive end David Irving were determined to have had close contact with Ferrell. It was later revealed that Ferrell and Joyner were the only ones who had tested positive. It is possible the players beside Ferrell and Joyner could play in the game against the Chiefs if they have positive tests before the game.

Week 12: at Atlanta Falcons

The Raiders suffered from an offensive meltdown against the Falcons as Carr threw a pick-six and lost 3 fumbles on the day and Jacobs also lost a fumble. The blowout loss dropped the Raiders to 6-5 on the season.

Week 13: at New York Jets

After suffering a disappointing loss, the Raiders then went to MetLife Stadium to face the winless Jets. The Jets took an early lead, before the Raiders tied with 12 seconds in the first quarter. The Jets scored again, but the PAT failed. The Raiders took a 17–10 halftime lead after scoring 10 points. The Raiders would take the lone TD in the third and lead 24–13. The Jets began to rally in the fourth, and managed to retake the lead with 5:34 remaining. After back and forth possessions, when it seemed like all hope was lost, Henry Ruggs scored the game-winning touchdown with five seconds left to give the Raiders the 31–28 win. Jets defensive coordinator Gregg Williams was fired after the game amid scrutiny for the "cover zero" play call on the Raiders' final touchdown, in which there was no safety left behind the play to help out in coverage, a risky call that allowed Ruggs to beat Jets rookie corner Lamar Jackson one-on-one for the easy touchdown. With the win, the Raiders improved to 7–5 and snapped a 2-game losing streak.

Week 14: vs. Indianapolis Colts

The loss had deeper repercussions as defensive coordinator Paul Guenther was fired following a poor performance which saw the Colts roll up 456 yards and 44 points.

Week 15: vs. Los Angeles Chargers

Forced into action when a groin injury sidelined Derek Carr, backup quarterback Marcus Mariota made his debut as a Raider and threw for 226 yards, a touchdown, and an interception, and rushed for 88 yards and the tying score in the fourth quarter. This was Mariota's first appearance in a game since the 2019 AFC Championship game, when he was a member of the Tennessee Titans. The Chargers twice missed field goal attempts in the final six minutes of regulation.

Week 16: vs. Miami Dolphins

The Raiders took a 13-6 lead at halftime, but the Dolphins were able to come back and tie the score at 16-16 with 4:01 remaining. Then both offenses exploded in the final few minutes to set up a wild finish. After a holding penalty on the Raiders, Carr completed a deep pass to Nelson Agholor, who then juked safety Bobby McCain and ran to the end zone for an 85-yard touchdown to put the Raiders up 22-16 after the missed extra point. The Dolphins then responded with a short pass from Ryan Fitzpatrick to Myles Gaskin, who broke a tackle and got some downfield blocks for a 59-yard touchdown to take the lead at 23-22 after the extra point. On the ensuing Raiders possession, Byron Jones was called for a penalty on another deep throw from Carr to Agholor, which set the Raiders up at the Dolphins' 22-yard line. The Raiders then ran out much of the clock and kicked a field goal to take a 25-23 lead with 0:19 remaining. On the first play of the Dolphins' next possession, Fitzpatrick completed an improbable 34-yard pass down the sideline to Mack Hollins with a defender dragging him down by the facemask as he threw the pass. The 15-yard facemask penalty put the Dolphins in field goal range, and after one incomplete pass, Jason Sanders' 44-yard field goal put the Dolphins ahead for good, 26-25. The Raiders fumbled on the ensuing kickoff and lateral, sealing the win for the Dolphins. With the close loss, the Raiders fell below .500 for the first time all season and were eliminated from contention in the 2020 playoffs.

Week 17: at Denver Broncos

The Raiders led 17–10 at halftime, but the Broncos later attempted a rally and, in a repeat of the previous week for the Raiders, the lead changed four times in the fourth quarter. This time, however, the Raiders would prevail, as Derek Carr led a touchdown drive and a successful two-point conversion, and then the Raiders special teams blocked a last-second field goal try by the Broncos.
With the win, the Raiders swept the Broncos for the first time since 2010. Also, head coach Jon Gruden swept the Broncos for the first time in his career.

Standings

Division

Conference

References

External links
 

Las Vegas
Las Vegas Raiders seasons
Las Vegas Raiders
21st century in Las Vegas